The Basilica of Saint Nicolas of Tolentino is a Roman Catholic church and minor basilica that is part of the Augustinian monastery in the hill-town of Tolentino, province of Macerata, Marche, central Italy. The church is a former cathedral of the Roman Catholic Diocese of Tolentino, suppressed in 1586.

Notably, it was the first minor basilica to be formally canonically created, by Pope Pius VI in the brief Supremus Ille in 1783. Prior to this, minor basilicas were created via immemorial custom.

It contains architecture and art from the 14th through the 17th century. The imposing marble facade of the church was constructed over the centuries, and was completed in the 17th century.

Interior

Chapels
Cappellone of San Nicola
The Cappellone di San Nicola is a Gothic chapel that opens to the cloister. The walls and ceiling are covered with early-14th century, Giottesque frescoes, attributed variously to the Master of Tolentino, the Master of the Magi of Fabriano, or Pietro da Rimini, depicting scenes from the Life of St Nicholas of Tolentino, Life of the Virgin, and episodes of the life of Christ. The spandrels of the chapel depict the four evangelists and four doctors of the church. The altar has a 15th-century polychrome stone statue of the saint, attributed to Niccolò di Giovanni, atop a funereal memorial. The saint's tomb lies in the crypt. The frescoes appear to have been completed within a few decades of the saint's death in 1305.
Chapel of the Sante Braccia (Holy Arms)
This chapel was erected for the veneration of the relics of the saint's arms. It is entered through a 17th-century portal, which enters what was once the sacristy and leads to the 15th-century chapel, reconstructed in 1670 to accommodate more pilgrims. In 1819, the walls were decorated with polychrome marble in scagliola by Stefano da Morrovalle. In 1850 the ceiling was decorated with stars by Emidio Pallotta. In 1662, the dome had been decorated with a stuccowork depicting Paradise by Marco Antonio Baraciola, an artist from Como. The lateral walls have two large canvases: a Fire in the Ducal Palace of Venice by Matteo Stom and a Plague affecting a Venetian city by Giovanni Carboncino. They were donated in the 17th century, and erected as allegories for the miraculous interventions of the saint. The walls are replete with ex voto donations. Six statues in stucco and bas reliefs beside the windows allude to the Virtues  of the saint are by Giambattista Latini da Mogliano, based on designs by Pallotta.
Chapel of Saint Anne (Sant'Anna)
This chapel, the first on the right, originally commissioned by the Benadduci family, houses a main altarpiece of the Vision of the Virgin by Saint Anne by Guercino. The lateral wall on the left has a canvas depicting the Glory of Saint Lucy with two Augustinian Saints (1754) by Marcantonio Romoli, a pupil of Placido Costanzi and Sebastiano Conca. The right wall has a 17th-century Prayer in Gesthemane.
Chapel of the Sacro Cuore (Sacred Heart)
This chapel, the second on the right, has a main altarpiece depicting the Sacred Heart of Christ shown to Saint Margherita Maria Alacoque (1920) by Virgilio Monti. The wooden crucifix on the right is said to be that venerated by Saint Nicola himself. There is also a 17th-century canvas depicting the Madonna, Saint John Evangelist, and Magdalen at the foot of the Cross
Chapel of the Beata Vergine del Buon Consiglio (Blessed Virgin of the Good Counsel)
This chapel, the third on the right, has a copy of the icon of this Marian veneration found at the Augustinian Sanctuary of Genazzano. This copy (1850) was completed by the Augustinian Giovanni Gerold and gilded by Tito Beccachiodi of Recanati. The walls were decorated with the Story of the Icon (1873) by Villebaldo Natali.
Chapel of the Virgine della Pace (Virgin of Peace)
This chapel, the fourth on the right, has an altarpiece depicting this veneration, Madonna dell'Ulivo (1810) by Giuseppe Lucatelli. A late 18th-century painting on the right shows Saint Nicola releasing souls from purgatory. The altar holds the relics of the Roman martyr Lorenzina in a casket with a wax body.
Chapel of St Thomas of Villanova 
This chapel, the first on the left, has an altarpiece depicting Charity of St Thomas (1663) by Giuseppe Ghezzi.
Chapel of the Beata Vergine della Consolazione (Blessed Virgin of Consolation)
This chapel, the second on the left, was commissioned by the Confraternity of Cinturati (Pregnant). The altarpiece depicts the Madonna pregnant between Saint Augustine and Saint Monica (1858) by Luigi Fontana, copied after a painting of Giovanni Gottardi in the church of Sant'Agostino in Rome.
Chapel of Santa Rita
This chapel, the third on the left, has a main altarpiece depicting Santa Rita (1912) by Girolamo Capofierri, a pupil of Emidio Pallotta. The painting is a copy of the canvas by Giacinto Brandi in the church of Sant'Agostino in Rome.
Chapel of the Madonna dei Miracoli 
This chapel, the fourth on the left, has a main altarpiece depicting a Miracle of San Giovanni da San Facondo reviving a young girl (1691) by Giovanni Anastasi.

Artwork in main church
The main altarpiece in the basilica is by Marchisiano di Giorgio (1518–1526).

Other paintings depict the Mystical night of Saint Catherine of Alexandria with Saints Nicola and Anthony of Padua by Simone de Magistris, the Apparition of the Madonna of Loreto to San Nicola attributed to Antonio Francesco Peruzzini. A San Nicola da Tolentino attributed to Simone de Magistris. Other paintings are attributed to Guercino and Rossellino.

Burials include that of St. Nicholas of Tolentino.

Notes

References

External links 

 Announcement of re-opening of Museo del Santuario
homepage

Gothic architecture in le Marche
Renaissance architecture in le Marche
Churches in Tolentino
Nicola a Tolentino